Renapur Assembly constituency was one of the 288 seats in Maharashtra assembly in India until 2009. The redrawing of political map in 2008 made the seat defunct. It was a high profile seat because Gopinath Munde used to contest from here.

Assembly Members
 1962 : Ganpathi Anna (CPI)
 1967 : A. G. Gitte
 1972 : Raghunath Munde (Congress)
 1978 : Raghunath Munde (Congress) 
 1980 : Gopinath Munde (BJP)
 1985 : Panditrao Daund (Congress)
 1990 : Gopinath Munde (BJP)
 1999 : Gopinath Munde (BJP)
 2004 : Gopinath Munde (BJP)
 2009 onwards : Seat does not exist.it becomes Latur Rural.

Election Results

1962 Assembly Election
 Ganpathi Anna (CPI) : 18,779 votes 
 Wamanrao Deshmukh (INC) : 13,269

1978 Assembly Election
 Munde Raghunath Venkatrao (INC) : 36,468 votes 
 Munde Gopinath Pandurang (JNP) : 32485

1980 Assembly Election
 Munde Gopinath Pandurang (BJP) : 38,443 votes 
 Kokate Baburao Narsinghrao Adaskar (Indira Congress) : 33267 votes

1999 Assembly Election
 Munde Gopinathrao Pandurang (BJP) : 70,187 votes 
 Munde Trimbak Patloba (NCP) : 39,254

2004 Assembly Election
 Gopinathrao Pandurang Munde (BJP) 92,745 votes 
 Fulchand Yedba Karad (NCP) : 54,312

References

Former assembly constituencies of Maharashtra